Eva's desert mouse (Peromyscus eva) is a species of rodent in the genus Peromyscus of the family Cricetidae found only in the Baja California peninsula of Mexico.

Description
Eva's desert mouse measures  from head to rump, on average, and has a  tail. The fur is russet or buff in color over most of the body, with pale grey markings on the nose, cheeks, and around the eyes. The ears are pale brown and almost hairless, and the underparts creamy white. It can most clearly be distinguished from the cactus mouse, which is found in the same geographical region, by the shape of the baculum, although it is also typically darker in color, and with a longer tail.

Little is known of the animal's biology, although it is usually found close to succulent plants, and appears to breed between February and July.

Distribution and habitat
Eva's desert mouse lives only in the southern part of the Baja California peninsula in Mexico. Within this region, it inhabits scrubland habitats below  dominated by plants such as cholla, Jatropha, and organ-pipe cactus, and in agricultural land. Two subspecies have been identified:

 Peromyscus eva eva - Mainland Baja California Sur
 Peromyscus eva carmeni - Carmen Island, in the Bahía de Loreto National Park

References

Peromyscus
Endemic mammals of Mexico
Rodents of North America
Endemic fauna of the Baja California Peninsula
Fauna of Gulf of California islands
Fauna of the Sonoran Desert
Natural history of Baja California Sur
Natural history of the Peninsular Ranges
Mammals described in 1898
Taxa named by Oldfield Thomas
Least concern biota of North America
Taxonomy articles created by Polbot